Gulnafis Aytmukhambetova (born 2 February 1988 in Atyrau) is a Kazakhstani taekwondo practitioner. She competed in the 67 kg event at the 2012 Summer Olympics and was eliminated by Franka Anić in the preliminary round.

References

1988 births
Living people
Kazakhstani female taekwondo practitioners
Olympic taekwondo practitioners of Kazakhstan
Taekwondo practitioners at the 2012 Summer Olympics
People from Atyrau
Asian Games medalists in taekwondo
Taekwondo practitioners at the 2010 Asian Games
Universiade medalists in taekwondo
Asian Games bronze medalists for Kazakhstan
Medalists at the 2010 Asian Games
Universiade gold medalists for Kazakhstan
Medalists at the 2009 Summer Universiade
21st-century Kazakhstani women